Women Without Men is a 1956 British drama film directed by Elmo Williams and Herbert Glazer and starring Beverly Michaels, Joan Rice and Hermione Baddeley. The screenplay concerns a woman who is unjustly sent to prison for an act which was really one of self-defense, and who escapes from prison in order to keep a rendezvous with her would-be fiancé, who has been out of the country and unaware of her plight.

For U.S. release the film was retitled Blonde Bait and substantially re-edited, with new scenes filmed by the American distributors (with additional American actors - e.g. Jim Davis replacing Paul Carpenter as Nick) and notable character and plot changes, such as turning the heroine into a gangster's moll, for whom the prison break in engineered by the police in hopes she will lead them to her much-wanted fugitive boyfriend. Other new actors were Richard Travis, Harry Lauter and Paul Cavanagh.  Beverly Michaels also appeared in the film's new ending sequence.

Plot

Cast
 Beverly Michaels - Angie Booth 
 Joan Rice - Cleo 
 Thora Hird - Granny 
 Avril Angers - Bessie 
 Paul Carpenter - Nick 
 Hermione Baddeley - Grace 
 Bill Shine - Reveller 
 Gordon Jackson - Percy
 Valerie White - Governor 
 Eugene Deckers - Pierre 
 April Olrich - Margueritte 
 Ralph Michael - Julian 
 Betty Cooper - Evans 
 Sheila Burrell - Babs 
 Michael Golden - Bargee

Critical reception
Sky Movies wrote, "Hammer Films, just before their success in the horror field, jumped on the band-wagon for women's prison films that had been rolling in Britain and America since the success of Caged in 1950. Beverly Michaels (sent to prison on the slimmest of pretexts), Joan Rice, April Olrich and Hermione Baddely are among those looking grim, while Thora Hird makes the most of one of her best film roles as the indomitable Granny." The Radio Times noted a "Second-feature British prison drama of no particular distinction, but deploying some humour and employing some interesting names - Thora Hird, Avril Angers - which up the entertainment quotient...it's good for an idle rainy afternoon or 2am insomnia."

References

External links

1956 films
1956 crime drama films
British crime drama films
Women in prison films
Films shot in Berkshire
Hammer Film Productions films
1950s prison films
1950s English-language films
1950s British films
British black-and-white films